Aklan State University) also referred to by its acronym ASU is a  provincial state university in Aklan province, Philippines. Its main campus is located in the town of  Banga, with four other campuses across the province. The ASU focuses on agriculture, fishery, arts and sciences, engineering and technology, and education.

Formerly known as the Aklan State College of Agriculture and the Aklan Agricultural College, the institution gained university status on April 4, 2001, with the signing of Republic Act 9055 by President Gloria Macapagal Arroyo.

Campuses

Banga (main) campus
The university has five campuses, the biggest of which is located in Banga, occupying  of land below Manduyog Hill, a tourist attraction famous for its life-sized Way of the Cross.

The campus is home to the College of Agriculture, Forestry, and Environmental Science (CAFES), College of Teacher Education, School of Arts and Sciences, School of Veterinary Medicine, Graduate School transferred to New Washington Campus, and the most recent school the School of Management Sciences previously under the School of Arts and Sciences, and now under by the supervision of CAFES.

The campus has a swimming pool, dormitories, and a university hotel that also caters to non-ASU people.

Kalibo campus
The campus in Kalibo, the provincial capital of Aklan, is home to the College of Industrial Technology formerly known as School of Industrial Technology. ASU-Kalibo Campus is also called the ASU-CIT. Located in Andagao, a busy area in Kalibo, ASU-Kalibo is the smallest of the five campuses, occupying , yet with the biggest number of student enrolled and the highest income earner among the five ASU campuses.

Before its integration into ASCA in 1999 and eventually becoming the College of Industrial Technology of Aklan State University, it was a separate institution known as the Roxas Memorial School of Arts and Trades (RMSAT) established in 1960 by virtue of Republic Acts 1952 and 2417 authored by Cong. Hon. Godofredo P. Ramos and Cong. Jose B. Legaspi, respectively. On June 10, 1983, RMSAT became a national college by virtue of Batas Pambansa Blg. 471 authored by Assemblyman Jose T. Tumbokon. RMSAT since then became known as the Roxas Memorial College of Arts and Trades (RMCAT).

Ibajay campus
The campus in Ibajay is home to the College of Hospitality And Rural Resource Management formerly known as School of Rural Resource Development and Management. Located in Colong-Colong, the campus occupies  of land.

Before its integration into ASCA in 1999 and eventually becoming the College of Hospitality And Rural Resource Management of Aklan State University, it was a separate institution known as the Ibajay National Agricultural and Industrial School (INAIS) established in 1965 as a feeder school of Aklan Agricultural College by virtue of Republic Act 4486 authored by Cong. Rafael B. Legaspi. On December 16, 1994, INAIS was converted into a polytechnic college by virtue of Republic Act No. 7838 authored by Cong. Allen S. Quimpo, known as the Western Aklan Polytechnic College (WAPC).

Makato campus
The campus in Makato originally served as an extension high school, and was thus called the ASU Annex. As of 2006, the campus is home to the Teacher Education Center, and occupies  in Barangay Calangcang.

Before its integration into ASCA in 1999 and eventually becoming the Teacher Education Center of Aklan State University (under the umbrella of the College of Teacher Education in Banga campus), it was a separate institution known as the Northern Panay Teachers College (NPTC) established in 1966 by virtue of Republic Act 4711 authored by Cong. Rafael B. Legaspi.

New Washington campus
The campus in New Washington is home to the College of Fisheries and Marine Sciences, formerly known as the School of Fisheries and Marine Sciences, and occupies  of land.

Before its integration into ASCA in 1999 and eventually becoming the College of Fisheries and Marine Sciences of Aklan State University, it was a separate institution established as New Washington Junior High School in 1948 and later New Washington High School when it progressed to complete secondary course. It was converted into Aklan National School of Fisheries in 1957 by virtue of Republic Act 1931 and into Aklan National College of Fisheries by virtue of Republic Act 3944. Both are authored by Cong. Godofredo Ramos.

Schools and colleges
Banga (Main) Campus
College of Agriculture, Forestry and Environmental Sciences
Department of Agricultural Engineering
Department of Animal Science
Department of Crop and Soils
Department of Economics and Business
Department of Extension and Community Development
Department of Forestry and Environmental Science
Department of Home Science
College of Teacher Education 
School of Arts and Sciences 
School of Veterinary Medicine
School of Management Sciences
Extension and Community Services
Information and Communication Technology Center
Graduate School
Research Development Services

Kalibo Campus
College of Industrial Technology

Ibajay Campus
College of Hospitality and Rural Resource Management

Makato Campus
Teacher Education Center

New Washington Campus
College of Fisheries and Marine Sciences

References

External links
 

State universities and colleges in the Philippines
Universities and colleges in Aklan